Pendikspor is a Turkish sports club based in Pendik, Istanbul. The club's homeground is the Pendik Stadium. The football team is widely known for their upsetting 2-1 victory over Fenerbahçe, in the 3rd round of the Turkish Cup (then Fortis Turkey Cup) on 14 December 1999.  Pendikspor would relegate the same season from the TFF First League. 

On 3 April 2022, Pendikspor guaranteed promotion to the TFF First League following a 3-1 victory against last in the league Eskişehirspor.

Honours
TFF 2. Lig
Winners: 1997-98
TFF 3. Lig
Winners: 2003-04

Current squad

Other players under contract

Out on loan

Former footballers
 Emrah Başsan
 Yaser Yıldız
 Uğur Uçar

External links
Official website
Pendikspor on TFF.org

References

 
Football clubs in Istanbul
Association football clubs established in 1950
1950 establishments in Turkey